Following is a list of notable soul food restaurants:

 Charles' Southern Style Kitchen, New York City
 Communion Restaurant and Bar, Seattle, Washington
 Delta Cafe, Portland, Oregon
 Erica's Soul Food, Portland, Oregon
 Everybody Eats PDX, Portland, Oregon
 Fair Deal Cafe, North Omaha, Nebraska
 H&H Restaurant, Macon, Georgia
 Kee's Loaded Kitchen, Portland, Oregon
 Mama Lo's, Gainesville, Florida
 Reo's Ribs, Portland, Oregon
 Roscoe's House of Chicken and Waffles
 Screen Door, Portland, Oregon
 Sylvia's Restaurant of Harlem, New York City
 Wash's Restaurant, Atlantic City, New Jersey

Soul food
Soul food restaurants